Gowerton railway station (originally Gower Road and later Gowerton North) serves the village of Gowerton, Wales. The station is unmanned but has a ticket machine, shelters on each platform and live train running information displays.

Background
Gowerton station was opened as Gower Road by the South Wales Railway on Tuesday 1 August 1854 It was later renamed Gowerton, following a request to the railway company by the parish vestry, and from 1950 became known as Gowerton North to distinguish it from the Gowerton South railway station which served the now closed Pontarddulais to Swansea Victoria section of the Heart of Wales Line until 1964.

History

The station originally had two platforms, sited on the section between Cockett station and Duffryn, but the track was singled in 1986 as an economy measure. Network Rail planned to re-double the section of railway through this station and re-instate the disused east-bound platform in May 2012. Work commenced in March 2013 and was completed a month later.

This has increased the capacity of this section of line and allowed more trains to stop at this station. The re-doubling work was completed in July 2013 with the disused platform brought back into use. This resulted in an additional 95 services stopping at Gowerton every week and this has also helped to increase passenger usage at the station, which has risen by 2,100% since 1998.

Services
The station was originally a request stop, but on 9 September 2013, it was no longer listed as one.

References

External links

Gowerton station after track redoubling in 2013

Railway stations in Swansea
DfT Category F2 stations
Former Great Western Railway stations
Railway stations in Great Britain opened in 1852
Railway stations served by Transport for Wales Rail
1852 establishments in Wales